"She Doesn't Live Here Anymore" is a song by Roxette, released as the third and final single from their greatest hits compilation Don't Bore Us, Get to the Chorus! Roxette's Greatest Hits (1995). The song had originally been written and recorded for the duo's 1994 studio album Crash! Boom! Bang! but, according to Marie Fredriksson, that version "sounded really tired", and has yet to be released. It was later re-recorded in July 1995 with members of Per Gessle's former band Gyllene Tider. It is the only song in Roxette's discography to not be produced by Clarence Öfwerman. "She Doesn't Live Here Anymore" was only released in Germany, Italy and the Netherlands, peaking at number 86 on the German Singles Chart. The single included two remixed versions of "The Look" as b-sides. Its music video was directed by Jonas Åkerlund.

Formats and track listings
All songs written by Per Gessle, except "She Doesn't Live Here Anymore" lyrics by Gessle, music by Gessle and Mats "MP" Persson.

 CD Single (Europe 8652332)
 "She Doesn't Live Here Anymore" – 4:03
 "The Look '95"  – 5:08
 "The Look"  – 4:10

Personnel
Credits adapted from the liner notes of Don't Bore Us, Get to the Chorus! Roxette's Greatest Hits.
 Recorded at Polar Studios, Stockholm in July 1995

Musicians
 Micke "Syd" Andersson – drums and tambourine
 Per Gessle – lead and background vocals, Benny-piano, tambourine, production and mixing
 Anders Herrlin – bass guitar and synthesizer
 Michael Ilbert – engineering, production and mixing
 Mats "MP" Persson – acoustic and electric guitars

Charts

References

1996 singles
1996 songs
Roxette songs
Music videos directed by Jonas Åkerlund
Songs written by Per Gessle
Songs written by Mats Persson (musician)